Cổ Loa Citadel is an important fortified settlement and archaeological site in present-day Hanoi's Đông Anh district, roughly 17 kilometers north of present-day Hanoi, in the upper plain north of the Red River. Various relics of the Bronze Age Phùng Nguyên culture and Đông Sơn culture have been found in Cổ Loa, although it was later established as the capital of Âu Lạc Kingdom during the 3rd century BCE (about 257 BCE). It might be the first political center of the Vietnamese civilization. The settlement’s concentric walls resemble a snail’s shell; it had an outer embankment covering 600 hectares.

Etymology
The name "Cổ Loa" is Sino-Vietnamese reading of 古螺 (< Middle Chinese (ZS) kuoX-luɑ > Standard Chinese: gǔ luó), literally meaning "ancient spiral". According to Đại Việt Sử Ký Toàn Thư, the citadel is shaped like a snail, reflecting of the citadel's multi-layered structure with concentric ramparts and moats.

History
Thục Phán of the Âu Việt people defeated the last Hung king, Hùng Duệ Vương in 257 BCE and founded the kingdom of Âu Lạc, choosing the site of Cổ Loa as his capital. Given its relatively large size, Cổ Loa maintained its dominant presence in the northern floodplain of the Red River Delta and would have required a large amount of labour and resources to construct.

The mythical story goes that when the fortress was being built, all the work done during the day was mysteriously destroyed at night. The king made a sacrifice to the gods and in one night, a golden turtle appeared to him in a dream and told him the fortress was built on the turtle's carapace. The king was instructed to build the city in a new location, that of present-day Cổ Loa. The king did so, and the city was soon finished.

Out of gratefulness to the king, the magic turtle gave the king a claw that he could use as a trigger on his crossbow.  When used, it multiplied its force by the thousands. However, one of the Qin dynasty general, Zhao Tuo, took advantage of the decline of the Qin and created his own kingdom north of Âu Lạc called Nanyue. He tried to conquer his southern neighbour but was defeated. Instead, he married his son to the daughter of the Thục Phán. When the son was in Cổ Loa, he discovered the magic turtle's claw and stole it. His father then proceeded to invade Âu Lạc and easily defeated it.

Stories of the Thục Phán's demise vary. Some say he committed suicide by jumping in the ocean. Some say he was borne off to sea by the magic turtle to never be seen again. In some versions, he was told by the magic turtle about his daughter's betrayal and killed his own daughter before killing himself.

Archaeology 

The site consists of two outer sets of ramparts and a citadel on the inside, of rectangular shape. The moats consist of a series of streams, including the Hoàng Giang River and a network of lakes that provided Cổ Loa with protection and navigation.

The outer rampart comprises a perimeter of 8 km and is lined with guard towers. The ramparts still stand up to 12 m high and are 25 m in width at their base. Besides, part of the inner rampart was cut through for the purpose of archaeological investigation, which was dated from 400-350 BCE. And it was suggested that this rampart was constructed by a local and indigenous society prior to the colonization of Han dynasty. The stamped earth technique or Hangtu method associated with ancient China may have been used in Cổ Loa, but studies of the defensive works are still in a preliminary stage. Also, archaeologists have estimated that over two million cubic metres of material were moved in order to construct the entire fortress, including moats that were fed by the Hoàng River. Kim estimated the population of Cổ Loa possibly ranged from 5,000 to around 10,000 inhabitants.

In 1970, the Vietnamese carried out an investigation at a collapsed portion of the outer wall, uncovering Dong Son culture sherds stratified beneath the wall. A 72kg bronze drum was later excavated outside the inner wall in the 1980s. In 2004–05, several cultural layers were identified within the inner wall area. Various Cổ Loa artefacts represented "elite-level or royal characteristics", discovered only within the site’s enclosures, supporting the notion of centralised production and monopolisation. 

Then in 2007 - 2008 another excavation took place that excavated the middle wall of Cổ Loa citadel. The excavation cut through the entire width of the rampart. The stratification showed multiple layers of construction deposits: three periods and five major phases of construction.

Excavations made by archaeologists have revealed Dong Son style pottery that had stratified over time under the walls, while a drum was found by chance by Nguyễn Giang Hải and Nguyễn Văn Hùng. The drum included a hoard of bronze objects. The rarity of such objects in Southeast Asia and the range found at Cổ Loa is believed to possibly be unique. The drum itself is one of the largest Bronze Age drums to have been recovered from the Red River Delta, standing 57 cm high and boasting a tympanum with a diameter of 73.6 cm. The drum itself weighs 72 kg and contains around 200 pieces of bronze, including 20 kg of scrap pieces from a range of artefacts. These include socketed hoes and ploughshares, socketed axes, and spearheads.

The artifacts are numerically dominated by the ploughshares, of which there are 96. Six hoes and a chisel were in the set. There were 32 socketed axes of various shapes, including a boat shaped axehead. This was almost a replica of a clay mound found in the grave of the bronze metalworker at Làng Cả. Sixteen spearheads, a dagger and eight arrowheads were also found. One spearhead generated special interest because it was bimetallic, with an iron blade fitting into a bronze socket.

See also
 List of capitals of Vietnam
 Triệu dynasty
 Nam Việt
 Triệu Đà
 Phiên Ngung
 Trọng Thuỷ
 An Dương Vương
 Âu Lạc
 Tây Vu Vương
 Đông Sơn culture
 Bách Việt

References

Bibliography

Further reading
Vietnam's First City: At the site of Co Loa, researchers are examining the foundations of power in Southeast Asia
Co Loa and the Story of the Headless Princess

Forts in Vietnam
Historical sites in Hanoi
Buildings and structures in Hanoi
Ancient Vietnam
Bronze Age Asia
Populated places established in the 3rd century BC
257 BC
250s BC establishments
3rd-century BC establishments
Đông Sơn culture
Archaeological sites in Vietnam
Citadels in Vietnam